The 2014 New York Comptroller election took place on November 4, 2014, to elect the New York State Comptroller. Incumbent Democratic Comptroller Thomas DiNapoli was re-elected to a second full term in office.

Background
Incumbent Democratic Comptroller Alan Hevesi was re-elected to a second term in 2006 but resigned a few days before the term would have begun, as part of a plea agreement from charges relating to his use of state employees to chauffeur his wife, who was ill (Hevesi had been convicted before the election but still defeated Christopher Callaghan by 56% to 39%). He was succeeded as Comptroller by Democratic State Assemblyman Thomas DiNapoli, who was elected in a joint session of the New York State Legislature in February 2007. DiNapoli was elected to a full term in 2010 with 51% of the vote.

Despite DiNapoli's relatively narrow win in 2010, Republicans do not believe that he is vulnerable because "Comptrollers seem to get re-elected as long as they do their jobs." They are instead concentrating their efforts on defeating Attorney General Eric Schneiderman, citing numerous reasons, including the fact that DiNapoli comes from Nassau County, as opposed to Schneiderman, who comes from the Upper West Side of Manhattan. Republicans initially found it extremely difficult to find even a paper candidate to fill the ballot line, with the Conservative Party saying it would nominate its own candidate if the Republicans didn't find someone. Onondaga County Comptroller Bob Antonacci stepped forward for the Republicans in May 2014.

Under a pilot program approved by the New York State Legislature as part of the 2014 state budget, the comptroller election was to be the first statewide election in New York to be publicly financed. Republican candidate Robert Antonacci agreed to take part in public financing matching funds, noting that he would not have entered the race had those funds not been made available. To qualify for matching funds (which will be taken from a slush fund set aside for money unclaimed by the state's citizens), he had to raise $200,000 from at least 2,000 donors, each of whom are limited to a maximum donation of $175; he can continue to receive much larger donations outside those he seeks to match. DiNapoli did not accept matching funds. Antonacci failed to qualify for matching funds and raised less than half of the money necessary to qualify. Antonacci later expressed dismay toward the New York Republican State Committee for failing to give him financial support and nearly quit the race.

Democratic primary

Candidates

Nominated
 Thomas DiNapoli, incumbent Comptroller

Withdrew
 Geeta Rankoth (removed from ballot)

Republican primary

Candidates

Nominated
 Bob Antonacci, Onondaga County Comptroller and candidate for New York Attorney General in 2010

Declined
 Rob Astorino, Westchester County Executive (running for Governor)
 Christopher Jacobs, Erie County Clerk and former Secretary of State of New York
 Harry Wilson, businessman and nominee for Comptroller in 2010

Major Third Parties
Besides the Democratic and Republican parties, the Conservative, Green, Independence and Working Families parties are qualified New York parties. These parties have automatic ballot access.

Conservative

Candidates

Nominated
 Robert Antonacci, Republican nominee

Green

Candidates

Nominated
 Theresa Portelli, nominee for Mayor of Albany in 2013 and former Albany City school board member

Independence

Candidates

Nominated
 Thomas DiNapoli, incumbent Comptroller

Working Families

Candidates

Nominated
 Thomas DiNapoli, incumbent Comptroller

Minor third parties
Any candidate not among the six qualified New York parties (Democratic, Republican, Conservative, Green, Independence and Working Families) must petition their way onto the ballot; they do not face primary elections. Independent nominating petitions began collecting signatures on July 8 and were due to the state by August 19.

Libertarian

Candidates

Nominated
 John Clifton, perennial candidate

Stop Common Core

Candidates

Nominated
 Robert Antonacci, Republican nominee

Women's Equality

Candidates

Nominated
 Thomas DiNapoli, incumbent Comptroller

General election

Polling

Results

References

2014 New York (state) elections